The 1978 Southern Cross Rally, officially the Southern Cross International Rally was the thirteenth running of the Southern Cross Rally and the fifteenth round of the 1978 FIA Cup for Rally Drivers. The rally took place between the 14th and the 18th of October 1978. The event covered 2,727 kilometres from Sydney to Port Macquarie.  It was won by George Fury and Monty Suffern, driving a Datsun Stanza.

Results

References

Rally competitions in Australia
Southern Cross Rally
Southern Cross Rally